This is a list of New Zealand television events and premieres occurred, or are scheduled to occur, in 2015, the 55th year of continuous operation of television in New Zealand.

Events
22 February – An episode of The X Factor causes controversy after featuring a man convicted of manslaughter auditioning for the programme and reaching the Boot Camp stage.
1 March – TV3 series The X Factor apologises after broadcasting an episode featuring convicted killer Shae Brider, who auditioned for the show, thus causing distress to the family of his victim.
16 March – X Factor judges Natalia Kills and husband Willy Moon are fired from the series by TV3 for launching into a tirade against contestant Joe Irvine on the previous day's show.
19 March – Natalia Kills and Willy Moon apologise for the X Factor tirade. I am Giant drummer Shelton Woolright and Australian singer Natalie Bassingthwaighte will replace the couple.
12 April – TV3 announces that its Sunday evening news bulletin will be shortened to 30 minutes from 24 May.
18 May - Beau Monga wins the second series of The X Factor.
21 May - TV3 announces (on Budget day) that the Campbell Live current affairs programme is to be axed, and replaced by a Monday to Thursday current affairs programme to follow the news.
8 June – Launch of Newsworthy, TV3's new late night weekday news programme, which is presented by Sam Hayes and David Farrier.
19 July - Stars in Their Eyes host Simon Barnett and his partner Vanessa Cole win the sixth series of Dancing with the Stars.

Premieres

Domestic series

International series

Telemovies and miniseries

Documentaries

Specials

Programming changes

Programmes changing networks
Criterion for inclusion in the following list is that New Zealand premiere episodes will air in New Zealand for the first time on the new network. This includes when a program is moved from a free-to-air network's primary channel to a digital multi-channel, as well as when a program moves between subscription television channels – provided the preceding criterion is met. Ended television series which change networks for repeat broadcasts are not included in the list.

Free-to-air premieres
This is a list of programmes which made their premiere on New Zealand free-to-air television that had previously premiered on New Zealand subscription television. Programs may still air on the original subscription television network.

Subscription premieres
This is a list of programmes which made their premiere on New Zealand subscription television that had previously premiered on New Zealand free-to-air television. Programmes may still air on the original free-to-air television network.

Programmes returning in 2015

Milestone episodes in 2015

Programmes ending in 2015

Deaths

References

 
Television